Théodule or Theodule is the French form of the given name Theodulus.
It may refer to:

Nicolas Anne Théodule Changarnier (1793–1877), French general, born at Autun
Théodule Devéria (died 1871), prominent French egyptologist who lived in the 19th century
Théodule Meunier (died 1907), French anarchist responsible for a series of bombings in Paris, France in 1892
Théodule Ribot (1823–1891), French realist painter
Théodule Tellier (born 1856), French printer and the co-founder of French philatelic publisher Yvert et Tellier
Théodule-Armand Ribot (1839–1916), French psychologist

French masculine given names